Mordella aculeata is a species of beetle in the genus Mordella of the family Mordellidae, which is part of the superfamily Tenebrionoidea. It was discovered in 1758.

Subspecies
 Mordella aculeata aculeata Linnaeus, 1758
 Mordella aculeata multilineata Champion, 1927
 Mordella aculeata nigripalpis Shchegolvera-Barovskaya, 1931

References

External links

 Fauna Europaea

Beetles described in 1758
aculeata
Taxa named by Carl Linnaeus